Clitoria moyobambensis is a species of legume in the family Fabaceae. It is found only in Peru.

References

moyobambensis
Flora of Peru
Vulnerable plants
Taxonomy articles created by Polbot